The Daniel V. Bean House is a historic house in Hamilton, Montana, U.S.. It was built in 1900. It is listed on the National Register of Historic Places.

History
The house was built in 1900 for Daniel V. Bean, a mill owner who was associated with copper baron and rancher Marcus Daly. Bean lived here with his wife, their two sons and their daughter. He was a Freemason, and he died in 1910.

In 1916, the house was acquired by Casper Oertli, a wheat thresher who worked on Daly's ranches. Oertli, who was born in Chicago, lived here with his wife, née Lucy Turnell, and their two sons. He was a Freemason for three decades, and he died in 1938.

Architectural significance
The house was designed in the Colonial Revival and Queen Anne architectural styles. It has been listed on the National Register of Historic Places since August 26, 1988.

References

National Register of Historic Places in Ravalli County, Montana
Queen Anne architecture in Montana
Colonial Revival architecture in Montana
Houses completed in 1900
Houses on the National Register of Historic Places in Montana
Hamilton, Montana
Houses in Ravalli County, Montana